Nansun Shi (born Shi Nan-Sun on 8 August 1951) is a Hong Kong film producer, presenter and a former senior advisor for Media Asia Group. She has been in the Hong Kong film industry for many decades and has contributed significantly to the Hong Kong cinema scene since the late 1970s.

Shi is ex-wife of celebrated director Tsui Hark.

Life and career 
Shi was born in Hong Kong, attended Maryknoll Convent School for primary and secondary education. She then obtained a degree in statistics and computing from the Polytechnic of North London in the mid-1970s.

Nansun Shi started working for television studios in 1978, involving herself in the publicity and programme departments. Her start as a producer arrived in 1981 when Karl Maka, Raymond Wong and Dean Shek formed Cinema City Studios. Shi is also known as the co-founder of Tsui Hark's production company Film Workshop Co. Ltd., a studio responsible for films such as the A Better Tomorrow, and Once Upon a Time in China.

 Honors and awards 
In April 2011, it was announced that she would be a member of the jury for the main competition at the 2011 Cannes Film Festival.

In August 2014, at the 67th Locarno Film Festival, Nansun was awarded its Best Independent Producer Award.

 References 

 Further reading 
 "24 hours with Nansun Shi", South China Morning Post'', Sunday, 24 October 2004

1951 births
20th-century Hong Kong actresses
Hong Kong film presenters
Hong Kong film producers
Living people
Officiers of the Ordre des Arts et des Lettres